Boy in a Box is a solo album by Johnny Goudie, released in 2005. It was the debut release for F+M records and was originally to be a "best of" album. In addition to new material, it also includes songs from Johnny's previous solo album I Love Elke as well as Goudie's final album ...Effects of Madness, both of which Johnny didn't think received a proper audience since Goudie broke up soon after the release of ...Effects of Madness, and Johnny joined Endochine soon after the release of I Love Elke.

Track listing
 "Sex Machine"
 "Hold Me Up Tonight"
 "Back of a Magazine"
 "I Am Falling"
 "Stay"
 "Everyone Remembers (When You're Cool)"
 "Open Invitation"
 "Hello, Good Morning"
 "Keep it in Bottles"
 "Standard Issue Pistol"
 "Leave it Alone"
 "Old Enough"

2005 albums
Johnny Goudie albums